STSS can refer to:

 Short track speed skating
 Social Theory and Social Structure
 Space Tracking and Surveillance System
 St. Teresa Secondary School
 Streptococcal toxic shock syndrome